Mittelangeln is a municipality in the district of Schleswig-Flensburg, in Schleswig-Holstein, Germany. It was formed on 1 March 2013 by the merger of the former municipalities Satrup, Rüde and Havetoftloit.

References

Schleswig-Flensburg